Llansawel is a village and community in Carmarthenshire, Wales, about ten miles north of Llandeilo. The community is bordered by the communities of: Pencarreg; Cynwyl Gaeo; Talley; Llanfynydd; Llanfihangel Rhos-y-Corn; and Llanybydder, all being in Carmarthenshire.

Llansawel's population was 438, according to the 2011 census; a 6.1% increase since the 413 people noted in 2001.

The 2011 census showed 47.9% of the population could speak Welsh, a fall from 60.8% in 2001.

Notable people 
 John Williams (died 1613), Principal of Jesus College, Oxford, from 1602 to 1613 and also Dean of Bangor.
 Griffith Powell (1561–1620), a philosopher and Principal of Jesus College, Oxford, from 1613 to 1620.
 DJ Williams (1885–1970), Welsh-language writer and Plaid Cymru co-founder

References

Communities in Carmarthenshire
Villages in Carmarthenshire